A cousin is the child of one's aunt or uncle, or a more distant relative who shares a common ancestor. Cousins may also refer to:

 Les Cousins (film), 1959 French film directed by Claude Chabrol
 Cousins (1989 film), American film directed by Joel Schumacher
 Cousins (2014 film), Indian film directed by Vysakh
 Cousins (2021 film), New Zealand film directed by Ainsley Gardiner and Briar Grace-Smith
 Cousins (TV series)
 "Cousins" (song)
 Cousins (band)
 Cousins (surname), people with the surname Cousins
 Leonel and Marco Salamanca, fictional hitmen in the TV series Breaking Bad referred to as "The Cousins" or "The Twins"

See also
 Cousin (disambiguation)
 Cousins Subs, a US sandwich chain 
 Couzens (disambiguation)